The Apartment - Celebrity Edition is the 4th season of the reality television show design competition, The Apartment which after six seasons is the longest running reality competition show in Asia. The season premiered on January 25, 2015 and aired on STAR World. Unlike previous seasons, the competitors were celebrities competing as individuals for a grand prize of $100,000 to donate to their chosen charity. The judging panel included mentor-judge Jamie Durie, judge Andrea Savage, and head judge Laurence Llewelyn-Bowen. Production for the season was held in Phuket, Thailand, with luxury villas provided by Castlewood Group. The show is created by Riaz Mehta and produced by Imagine Group.

Format 

Over 10 weeks, celebrities are given the challenge of designing one room or area in 1 of 4 luxury villas. For the first few weeks, the celebrities are divided into teams of 3 or 4 to collaborate on their designs. The winning team will receive a prize and may choose another team to share their prize with. Each team is evaluated by the three recurring judges and sometimes, with a guest judge, in the show's ""Design Court"". The losing team will face elimination and sign their stars on The Floor of Shame.

Contestants

Episodes

Teams

Elimination 

 Green background and WINNER means the contestant won The Apartment - Celebrity Edition.
 Silver background and RUNNER-UP means the contestant was the runner-up on The Apartment - Celebrity Edition.
 Blue background and WIN means the contestant won that challenge.
 Pink background and BTM 3 mean the contestant worst challenge but safe.
 Orange background and BTM 2 mean the contestant worst challenge but safe.
 Dark Yellow background and WDR mean contestant withdrew due to fight of a team.
 Red background and ELIM means the contestant lost and was eliminated of the competition.

In episode 2, Jamie had a conversation with Nicole and said that she would leave the competition due to the competition being manipulated by the producers. On the second design court, Rima and Mary Christina landed in the bottom two. No one was eliminated.

In episode 3, Team Rima won the challenge. The other two teams lost in the challenge. Because of that, Laurence let the two team leaders nominate one of their team members to be in the bottom two. Xiao nominated Ryan and Paula nominated Lucy. Both of them were safe, but Cindy was eliminated.

In episode 5, All teams failed except for Team Xiao. No one was eliminated.

In episode 7, Chef Lau and Ryan landed in the bottom two. Both of them were to be eliminated, but instead Ryan was safe and Mary Christina was eliminated. Mary Christina was eliminated because the judges made a decision that she was the lesser interior designer.

Episode 9 was a recap episode.

In episode 9, two celebrities would move to the finals and two would be eliminated. Laurence let the four finalists divide into pairs. One pair will be safe and one will not. Xiao was paired with Rima and Paula was paired with Ryan. This episode ends on a cliffhanger. In the beginning episode 10, Rima and Xiao had moved to the finals and Paula and Ryan were eliminated.

Broadcast

The show premiered on STAR World Asia on January 25, 2015 airing every Sunday night. STAR World Philippines aired the show 3 weeks later, premiering on February 17, 2015, and airing every Tuesday night.

See also
The Apartment Vietnam

References

2015 Thai television seasons
Celebrity reality television series
Home renovation television series
Television shows filmed in Thailand